The following is a list of Kenya's richest. It is based on an annual assessment of wealth and assets compiled and published by Forbes magazine.

Kenya is the largest economy in the East African Community, the 3rd largest economy in Sub-Saharan Africa, with a gross domestic product of US$120.87 billion as of 2020 up from US$70.539 billion in 2017. Kenya ranks behind only South Africa and Nigeria in GDP rankings of Sub-Saharan African countries.

2015

2014

2013

2012

2011

See also
 Economy of Kenya
 East African Community
 Forbes list of billionaires
 List of countries by the number of billionaires
 List of conglomerates in Kenya
 List of conglomerates in Africa

References

Kenya
net worth
net worth